is a train and tram station located in the same vicinity in the city of  Nankoku, Japan. The train station is operated by the third-sector Tosa Kuroshio Railway with the station number "GN39". The tram station is the eastern terminus of the Gomen Line operated by Tosaden Kōtsū.

Lines
All rapid and local trains on the line stop at the station.

Layout
The train station consists of a side platform serving a single elevated track. There is no station building but the platform has a shelter for waiting passengers. In addition, there is a traditional style tiled-roof waiting room set up under the elevated structure. Access to the platform is by means of a flight of steps. Bicycle parking is available under the elevated structure and car parking is available at the station forecourt.

The tram station is located at grade in the train station forecourt and at right angles to the railway track.

Adjacent stations

|-
!colspan=5|Tosa Kuroshio Railway

|-
!colspan=5|Tosaden Kōtsū

History

The tram station was opened on 21 February 1925 under the name Gomen-ekimae. On 26 July 1974, it was renamed Gomenmachi and moved to its present position from a location further to the west.

Passenger statistics
In fiscal 2011, the train station was used by an average of 326 passengers daily.

Surrounding area
Nankoku Municipal Gomenoda Elementary School

See also 
List of railway stations in Japan

References

External links

Railway stations in Kōchi Prefecture
Railway stations in Japan opened in 1925
Nankoku, Kōchi